The white-winged brushfinch (Atlapetes leucopterus) is a species of bird in the family Passerellidae.

It is found in Ecuador and Peru. Its natural habitats are subtropical or tropical dry forest, subtropical or tropical moist lowland forest, subtropical or tropical moist montane forest, and heavily degraded former forest.

References

white-winged brush finch
Birds of the Ecuadorian Andes
Birds of the Peruvian Andes
white-winged brush finch
Taxonomy articles created by Polbot